Bang is a romanization of the Korean word 방, meaning "room". In a traditional Korean house, a sarangbang (Hangul: 사랑방; Hanja: 舍廊房) is the study or drawing room, for example.

In modern Korea (especially in the South), the concept of a bang has expanded and diversified from being merely a walled segment in a domestic space, to including buildings or enterprises in commercial, urban, space, such as a PC bang (an internet café), a noraebang (a karaoke room), sojubang (a soju room, i.e. a pub), manhwabang (a manhwa room, where people read or borrow manhwa) and a jjimjilbang (elaborate Korean public bathhouse). This can be compared with the similar expansion of the concept of a "house" to include upper houses, opera houses, coffee houses, and publishing houses.

Phonetically more tensed word ppang (빵) is used as an abbreviation of a noun gambang (Hangul: 감방; Hanja: 監房; McCune-Reischauer: kambang), meaning "jail".

Multibang

Multibang is a kind of entertainment venue in South Korea where people can play video games and board games. In addition, they can eat snacks, drink non-alcoholic beverages, sing, and watch films.

See also
 Contemporary culture of South Korea
 PC bang
 Noraebang
 Manhwabang
 Jjimjilbang

Notes

References 

 
 
 
 

Rooms
Korean culture
South Korean culture